Andrew Scheinman is an American film and television producer, as well as a film director and screenwriter.  Before he got his start in entertainment, he worked as a professional tennis player, as well as earning a JD from the University of Virginia School of Law in 1973. He is one of the heads of Castle Rock Entertainment.

He won an Emmy Award for producing Seinfeld and was nominated for an Academy Award for producing A Few Good Men.

Filmography
He was producer for all films unless otherwise noted.

Film

As writer

As director

Script and continuity department

Miscellaneous crew

Thanks

Television

As writer

References

External links
 
 

American film directors
American film producers
American film studio executives
American male screenwriters
Emmy Award winners
Living people
University of Virginia School of Law alumni
Year of birth missing (living people)
Place of birth missing (living people)
George School alumni

American independent film production company founders
American male tennis players